Hemidactylus fragilis is a species of gecko, a lizard in the family Gekkonidae. The species is indigenous to the Horn of Africa.

Geographic range
H. fragilis is found in Ethiopia and Somalia.

Taxonomy
H. fragilis is sometimes considered conspecific with the common house gecko, H. frenatus.  In fact, it had been synonymized with the species by Loveridge in 1947, but was resurrected by Mazuch et al. in 2016.

Description

Reproduction
H. fragilis is oviparous.

References

Further reading
Calabresi E (1915). "Contributo alla conoscenza dei Rettili della Somalia". Monitore Zoologico Italiano 26: 234–247. (Hemidactylus fragilis, new species, pp. 236–237, Figure 1). (in Italian).
Lanza B (1990). "Amphibians and reptiles of the Somali Democratic Republic: check list and biogeography". Biogeographia 14: 407–465. (Hemidactylus fragilis, p. 415).
Loveridge A (1947). "Revision of the African Lizards of the Family Gekkonidae". Bulletin of the Museum of Comparative Zoölogy at Harvard College 98: 1–469. (Hemidactylus frenatus, pp. 127–130).
Mazuch T, Šmíd J, Bauer AM (2016). "Rediscovery and a new record of Hemidactylus laevis Boulenger, 1901 (Reptilia: Gekkonidae) from Somaliland, with notes on the resurrection of Hemidactylus fragilis". Zootaxa 4117 (4): 529–542. 

Hemidactylus
Reptiles described in 1915